is a Japanese manga series written and illustrated by Mizuki Kuriyama. It was serialized in Shogakukan's shōnen manga magazine Weekly Shōnen Sunday from April 2017 to April 2022, with its chapters collected in 20 tankōbon volumes.

Plot
The story follows lawman Elmore Evans, who, despite being one of the most amazing gunslingers in the West, cannot get rid of his bad luck in his romantic life.

Characters

The Sheriff of a small town in the Wild West. He is skilled at his work and weapon handling, but terrible with women. He says things that are not necessarily true to impress women, often getting into wacky predicaments.

A bounty hunter and a self-proclaimed rival of Sheriff Evans. She has feelings for Evans, but cannot express them due to her pride.

The former Sheriff of the town. His words and lessons are followed by his son.

Evans' deputy sheriff.

A Deputy U.S. Marshall operating in the region. She is clumsy and is often thought to be angry by others, but is in fact a self-conscious person.

The Sheriff of Mark Flag, a neighboring village.

Publication
Hoankan Evans no Uso: Dead or Love, written and illustrated by Mizuki Kuriyama, was serialized in Shogakukan's shōnen manga magazine Weekly Shōnen Sunday from April 12, 2017, to April 20, 2022. Shogakukan collected its chapters in twenty tankōbon volumes, released from September 15, 2017, to June 17, 2022.

Volume list

References

External links
 

Comedy anime and manga
Shogakukan manga
Shōnen manga
Western (genre) anime and manga